Peter Zaratin is the CEO of Globall Concepts, a soccer and management company based on Long Island. Before founding the corporation, he played and coached professional soccer. Zaratin played in the goalkeeper position for several United Soccer League (USL) soccer franchises including the Staten Island Vipers, the New York Fever, and the Montreal Impact. During the 1998 season, playing with the Impact, he was recruited by Spandauer Sport Verein, a former 3rd division club in the German Regionalliga.

College
Prior to college, Peter played for the regional and State ODP Program. Peter attended Santa Clara University (1990–1995), and played Soccer there for all years he attended. During his attendance, Peter played under former U.S. World Cup coach Steve Sampson. During his college career, he was a member of the 1992 team that went to the National Finals of the NCAA. Peter was named Team Captain in 1994 and was awarded numerous West Coast Conference Awards. Peter graduated from Santa Clara University in 1995 with a B.S. in Communications.

Professional
Peter played at the professional level with multiple USL A-League teams such as the Raleigh Flyers, Staten Island Vipers, New York Fever, and Montreal Impact. He also played with Spanauer Sport Verin (3rd Bundesliga / Germany). Peter was voted one of the top goalkeepers in the German Regionalliga.

Coaching
Zaratin has extensive coaching experience; he has coached at the camp, college, and professional levels and taught goalkeeper seminars at the Anchorage Soccer Club. He was the Camp Director of the Santa Clara University soccer program, and the head coach of the women's team at Canada College from 1992 to 1993.

In 2003, he was named head goalkeeper coach for the New York Power. He also was Head Coach at Caňada Junior College (California) and Menlo-Atherton High School Head Coach (California). Today, Peter serves as a Volunteer Goalkeeper Coach at Hofstra University and is the coaching director of the Junior Rough Rider Youth Program.

Globall Soccer Concepts
Prior to his current position, Peter formed Globall Soccer Concepts, Inc. Within a three-year period Peter developed Globall into a reputable soccer training and management company. One of the main drivers of growth for Globall was in the area of indoor facility development. To that end, Peter has established relationships with various individuals and organizations to expand facility usage that supports the current youth program business of the Rough Riders.

Long Island Rough Riders
In 2005, Zaratin acquired the Long Island Rough Riders professional men's franchise which currently competes in the Player Development League (PDL) of the United Soccer Leagues. The Long Island Lady Riders women's franchise was established in 2007. Today, the Long Island Rough Riders organization also includes a youth development program known as the Junior Rough Riders. In addition, the Rough Riders conduct camps, leagues, tournaments and training services to the Long Island soccer community.

Partnership
In 2011, Zaratin collaborated with real estate developer and New York Islanders owner Charles Wang to convert a Nassau County warehouse into a modern indoor multi-sport complex. Zaratin was inducted into the Glen Cove Hall of Fame for his playing and coaching achievements.

Awards and Licenses
Peter holds a USSF A, USSF B, and a USSF youth License. He was also an inducted member of the City of Glen Cove Hall of Fame for playing and Coaching Accomplishments.

References

Living people
Year of birth missing (living people)
Place of birth missing (living people)
Staten Island Vipers players
New York Fever players
Montreal Impact (1992–2011) players
Association football goalkeepers
American soccer players